George Marino (1947–2012) was an American mastering engineer known for working on albums by rock bands starting in the late 1960s. Marino mastered and remastered thousands of albums in over forty years. He started his career at Capitol Records and was there from 1967 to 1971, then became a partner in the Record Plant's Master Cutting Room from 1971 to 1973. Marino spent the vast majority of his career mastering at Sterling Sound from 1973 until his death in 2012.

Selected works

1969 – 1980
 1969	Live Peace in Toronto 1969 – John Lennon & Plastic Ono Band
 1970	The Morning After – The J. Geils Band
 1971	5'll Getcha Ten – Cowboy
 1971	Electric Warrior – T. Rex
 1971	Fly – Yoko Ono
 1971	Liv – Livingston Taylor
 1972	Fresh – Raspberries 
 1972	Odyssey	– Odyssey
 1972	Talking Book – Stevie Wonder
 1972	Dinnertime – Alex Taylor
 1973	Innervisions – Stevie Wonder
 1973	Approximately Infinite Universe – Yoko Ono
 1973	Billion Dollar Babies – Alice Cooper
 1973	Bloodshot – The J. Geils Band
 1973	Feeling the Space – Yoko Ono
 1973	Laid Back – Gregg Allman
 1973	Brothers and Sisters – The Allman Brothers Band
 1974	A New Life – The Marshall Tucker Band
 1974	Highway Call – Richard Betts
 1974	Kiss – Kiss
 1974	Nightmares...and Other Tales from the Vinyl Jungle – The J. Geils Band
 1974	The Gregg Allman Tour – Gregg Allman
 1974	Where We All Belong – The Marshall Tucker Band
 1974	He Don't Love You, Like I Love You – Tony Orlando and Dawn
 1974	Tasty – The Good Rats
 1974	Reunion in Central Park – The Blues Project
 1974	Prime Time – Tony Orlando and Dawn
 1975	Not a Word on It – Pete Carr
 1975	Physical Graffiti – Led Zeppelin
 1975	Searchin' for a Rainbow- The Marshall Tucker Band
 1975	Straight Shooter – Bad Company
 1975	No Reservations – Blackfoot
 1975	Skybird – Tony Orlando and Dawn
 1976	A Fifth of Beethoven – Walter Murphy
 1976	Helluva Band – Angel
 1976	Honor Among Thieves  – Artful Dodger
 1976	Leftoverture – Kansas
 1976	Long Hard Ride – The Marshall Tucker Band
 1976	Radio Ethiopia – Patti Smith Group
 1976	Saddle Tramp – The Charlie Daniels Band
 1976	High Lonesome – The Charlie Daniels Band
 1976	Stuff – Stuff
 1976	Some People Can Do What They Like – Robert Palmer
 1977	Derringer Live – Rick Derringer
 1977	Draw the Line – Aerosmith
 1977	In Color – Cheap Trick
 1977	Let There Be Rock – AC/DC
 1977	Monkey Island – The J. Geils Band
 1977	Point of Know Return – Kansas
 1977	So So Satisfied – Ashford & Simpson
 1977	The Wetter The Better – Wet Willie
 1977	Firefall – Firefall
 1977	Children of the World – Bee Gees
 1977	Double Vision – Foreigner
 1977	Carolina Dreams – The Marshall Tucker Band
 1977	I'm in You – Peter Frampton
 1977	Feelin' Bitchy – Millie Jackson
 1977	Here at Last... Bee Gees... Live – Bee Gees
 1977	Let There Be Rock – AC/DC
 1977	On Earth as It Is in Heaven – Angel
 1977	Once Upon a Dream – Enchantment
 1977	Overnight Angels – Ian Hunter
 1977	Raisin' Hell – Elvin Bishop 
 1977	Redwing – Grinderswitch 
 1977	Short Trip to Space – John Tropea 
 1977	The Doctor Is In – Ben Sidran
 1977	Alive II – Kiss
 1977	Sweet Evil – Derringer
 1977	Midnight Wind – The Charlie Daniels Band
 1977	Dickey Betts & Great Southern – Dickey Betts & Great Southern
 1978	A Little Kiss in the Night – Ben Sidran
 1978	Double Dose – Hot Tuna
 1978	Gene Simmons – Kiss
 1978	Heaven Tonight – Cheap Trick
 1978	Jaded Virgin – Marshall Chapman
 1978	Jazz – Queen
 1978	Live – Frank Marino & Mahogany Rush
 1978	Paul Stanley – Kiss
 1978	Safety in Numbers – Crack the Sky
 1978	The Cars – The Cars
 1978	Flirtin' with Disaster – Molly Hatchet
 1978	Head Games – Foreigner
 1978	In Through the Out Door – Led Zeppelin
 1978	Live Killers – Queen
 1978	Night in the Ruts – Aerosmith
 1978	Ace Frehley – Kiss
 1978	Heart to Heart – David Sanborn
 1978	Atlanta's Burning Down – Dickey Betts & Great Southern
 1978	Two for the Show – Kansas
 1979	A Different Kind of Crazy – Head East
 1979	Cheap Trick at Budokan – Cheap Trick
 1979	Breaking Loose – Helix
 1979	Dream Police – Cheap Trick
 1979	Dreams of Tomorrow – Lonnie Liston Smith
 1979	First Glance – April Wine
 1979	Hideaway – David Sanborn
 1979	High and Outside – Steve Goodman
 1979	In Style – David Johansen
 1979	Jackrabbit Slim – Steve Forbert
 1979	Sinful – Angel
 1979	Somewhere in My Lifetime – Phyllis Hyman
 1979	You're Never Alone with a Schizophrenic – Ian Hunter
 1979	In the Eye of the Storm – Outlaws
 1979	Spirits Having Flown – Bee Gees
 1979	Guitars and Women – Rick Derringer
 1979	Dynasty – Kiss
 1979	Candy-O – The Cars

1980s – 1990s
 1980	Blizzard of Ozz – Ozzy Osbourne
 1980	Double Fantasy – John Lennon/Yoko Ono
 1980	Feel the Heat – Henry Paul Band
 1980	For Men Only – Millie Jackson
 1980	Have a Good Time but Get Out Alive! – The Iron City Houserockers
 1980	Humans – Bruce Cockburn
 1980	I Had to Say It – Millie Jackson
 1980	Reach for the Sky – The Allman Brothers Band
 1980	Unmasked – Kiss
 1980	What Cha' Gonna Do for Me – Chaka Khan
 1980	Go to Heaven – Grateful Dead
 1980	Undertow – Firefall
 1980	Naughty – Chaka Khan
 1980	Dregs of the Earth – Dixie Dregs
 1980	Danger Zone – Sammy Hagar
 1981	Believers – Don McLean
 1981	Air Raid – Air Raid 
 1981	Bad for Good – Jim Steinman 
 1981	Belo Horizonte – John McLaughlin
 1981	Bobby and the Midnites – Bobby and the Midnites 
 1981	Breaking All the Rules – Peter Frampton 
 1981	Danny Joe Brown and the Danny Joe Brown Band – Danny Joe Brown 
 1981	Diary of a Madman – Ozzy Osbourne 
 1981	Don't Say No – Billy Squier 
 1981	Early Damage – Urban Verbs 
 1981	Earthshaker – Y&T
 1981	Full House: Aces High – The Amazing Rhythm Aces 
 1981	Fun in Space – Roger Taylor 
 1981	Get Lucky – Loverboy 
 1981	I'm In Love – Evelyn "Champagne" King 
 1981	Inner City Front – Bruce Cockburn 
 1981	Iron Age – Mother's Finest 
 1981	Living in a Movie – Gary Myrick 
 1981	Nature of the Beast – April Wine 
 1981	North Coast – Michael Stanley Band 
 1981	Only a Lad – Oingo Boingo 
 1981	Power of Rock 'n' Roll – Frank Marino 
 1981	Shake It Up – The Cars 
 1981	Special Identity – Joanne Brackeen 
 1981	Take No Prisoners – Molly Hatchet 
 1981	The Producers – The Producers 
 1981	The Wild, The Willing and the Innocent – UFO 
 1981	Unsung Heroes – The Dregs 
 1981	Walking on Thin Ice – Yoko Ono
 1981	Voyeur – David Sanborn
 1981	Peter Cetera – Peter Cetera
 1981	4 – Foreigner
 1981	Here Comes the Night – David Johansen
 1981	Creatures of the Night – Kiss
 1981	Turn Back – Toto
 1982	Another Grey Area – Graham Parker
 1982	Backstreet – David Sanborn
 1982	Beatitude – Ric Ocasek
 1982	Coup d'Etat – Plasmatics
 1982	Hot Space – Queen
 1982	Industry Standard – The Dixie Dregs
 1982	It's Alright (I See Rainbows) – Yoko Ono
 1982	Juggernaut – Frank Marino
 1982	Levon Helm – Levon Helm
 1982	Los Hombres Malo – Outlaws
 1982	Mechanix – UFO
 1982	Objects of Desire – Michael Franks
 1982	Old Songs for the New Depression – Ben Sidran
 1982	One on One – Cheap Trick
 1982	Power Play – April Wine
 1982	The Art of Control – Peter Frampton
 1982	Times of Our Lives – Judy Collins
 1982	World Radio – Leo Sayer
 1982	Rebel Yell – Billy Idol
 1982	Toto IV – Toto
 1983	First Strike – Cobra
 1983	Frontiers – Journey
 1983	Holy Diver – Dio
 1983	In Your Eyes – George Benson
 1983	Lick It Up – Kiss
 1983	Passion, Grace & Fire – Paco de Lucía
 1983	Rescue- Clarence Clemons & the Red Bank Rockers
 1983	She's So Unusual – Cyndi Lauper
 1983	Shout at the Devil – Mötley Crüe
 1983	The Trouble with Normal	– Bruce Cockburn
 1983	What's Funk? – Grand Funk Railroad
 1983	Bon Jovi – Bon Jovi
 1983	Condition Critical – Quiet Riot
 1984	Chicago 17 – Chicago
 1984	'74 Jailbreak – AC/DC
 1984	Animalize – Kiss 
 1984	Bad Attitude – Meat Loaf 
 1984	Bop City – Ben Sidran 
 1984	Crusader – Saxon 
 1984	Gato...Para los Amigos – Gato Barbieri 
 1984	Go Insane – Lindsey Buckingham 
 1984	Heartbeat City – The Cars 
 1984	Hot Shot – Pat Travers 
 1984	Marcus Miller – Marcus Miller 
 1984	Medicine Show – The Dream Syndicate 
 1984	Milk and Honey – John Lennon 
 1984	Powerslave – Iron Maiden 
 1984	Ride the Lightning – Metallica 
 1984	Straight to the Heart – David Sanborn 
 1984	Street Talk – Steve Perry 
 1984	The Blitz – Krokus 
 1984	The Last in Line – Dio 
 1984	Tooth and Nail – Dokken 
 1984	W.O.W. – Wendy O. Williams 
 1984	Where Angels Fear to Tread – Heaven
 1984	Windows and Walls – Dan Fogelberg
 1985	True Colors – Cyndi Lauper
 1985	7800° Fahrenheit – Bon Jovi
 1985	Ain't Love Grand! – X
 1985	All Those Wasted Years- Hanoi Rocks
 1985	Armed and Dangerous – Anthrax 
 1985	Double Trouble Live – Molly Hatchet 
 1985	Eaten Alive – Diana Ross   
 1985	Fly on the Wall – AC/DC 
 1985	Go West – Go West  
 1985	Hero – Clarence Clemons & the Red Bank Rockers 
 1985	High Country Snows – Dan Fogelberg 
 1985	Nervous Night – The Hooters 
 1985	No Muss...No Fuss – Donnie Iris 
 1985	On the Cool Side – Ben Sidran 
 1985	Play Deep – The Outfield 
 1985	Skin Dive – Michael Franks 
 1985	Standing on the Edge – Cheap Trick 
 1985	Steady Nerves – Graham Parker & the Shot 
 1985	Whitney Houston – Whitney Houston 
 1986	Alive & Screamin' – Krokus 
 1986	Bangin' – The Outfield 
 1986	Beauty in the Beast – Wendy Carlos 
 1986	Chicago 18 – Chicago 
 1986	Enough Is Enough – Billy Squier 
 1986	From Luxury to Heartache – Culture Club 
 1986	Inside the Electric Circus – W.A.S.P.
 1986	John Eddie – John Eddie 
 1986	Johnny Comes Marching Home – The Del-Lords 
 1986	Kommander of Kaos – Wendy O. Williams 
 1986	Love's Gonna Get Ya! – Ricky Skaggs
 1986	Master of Puppets – Metallica 
 1986	Menlove Ave. – John Lennon 
 1986	Slippery When Wet – Bon Jovi 
 1986	Somewhere in Time – Iron Maiden 
 1986	Songs from the Film – Tommy Keene 
 1986	Street Language – Rodney Crowell 
 1986	The Doctor – Cheap Trick  
 1986	Those of You with or Without Children, You'll Understand – Bill Cosby 
 1986	True Colors – Cyndi Lauper  
 1986	Whiplash Smile – Billy Idol 
 1986	Whitney – Whitney Houston
 1987	Appetite for Destruction – Guns N' Roses 
 1987	Door to Door – The Cars 
 1987	Dream Evil – Dio 
 1987	E.S.P. – Bee Gees 
 1987	Elisa Fiorillo – Elisa Fiorillo 
 1987	Exiles – Dan Fogelberg 
 1987	Happy Together – The Nylons 
 1987	I'm the Man – Anthrax 
 1987	King's Record Shop – Rosanne Cash 
 1987	Live...In the Raw – W.A.S.P. 
 1987	Midnight to Midnight – The Psychedelic Furs 
 1987	Obsession – Bob James 
 1987	Once Bitten... – Great White 
 1987	One Way Home – The Hooters 
 1987	Permanent Vacation – Aerosmith 
 1987	Pride – White Lion 
 1987	Surfing with the Alien – Joe Satriani 
 1987	Unfinished Business – Ronnie Spector 
 1987	Non Stop –  Julio Iglesias
 1988	Wide Awake in Dreamland – Pat Benatar
 1988	...And Justice for All – Metallica 
 1988	Blow Up Your Video – AC/DC 
 1988	Close-Up – David Sanborn 
 1988	Exciter – Exciter
 1988	G N' R Lies – Guns N' Roses 
 1988	Kings of the Sun – Kings of the Sun 
 1988	Lita – Lita Ford 
 1988	New Jersey – Bon Jovi
 1988	Nice Place to Visit – Frozen Ghost 
 1988	No Place for Disgrace – Flotsam and Jetsam 
 1988	Notes from America – Bonnie Tyler 
 1988	Outrider – Jimmy Page 
 1988	Racing After Midnight – Honeymoon Suite
 1988	Second Sighting	– Ace Frehley 
 1988	Seventh Son of a Seventh Son – Iron Maiden 
 1988	Shooting Rubberbands at the Stars – Edie Brickell & New Bohemians 
 1988	Social Intercourse – Smashed Gladys 
 1988	Sweet Dreams – Sword 
 1988	The Headless Children – W.A.S.P. 
 1988	Too Hot to Touch – Ben Sidran 
 1988	Under the Influence – Overkill 
 1988	Wide Awake in Dreamland – Pat Benatar 
 1988	Wild Wild West – The Escape Club
 1989	A Night to Remember – Cyndi Lauper 
 1989	Bad English – Bad English 
 1989	Big Game – White Lion 
 1989	Bleach – Nirvana
 1989	Dr. Feelgood – Mötley Crüe 
 1989	Hard Volume – Rollins Band 
 1989	Human Soul – Graham Parker  
 1989	Little Caesar – Little Caesar 
 1989	Love + War – Lillian Axe 
 1989	Magnum Cum Louder – Hoodoo Gurus 
 1989	Mother's Milk – Red Hot Chili Peppers 
 1989	One – Bee Gees 
 1989	Point Blank – Bonfire
 1989	Raging Slab – Raging Slab 
 1989	Sea Hags – Sea Hags 
 1989	Slowly We Rot – Obituary 
 1989	Smoking in the Fields – The Del Fuegos 
 1989	The Great Radio Controversy – Tesla 
 1989	Trash – Alice Cooper 
 1989	Twice Shy – Great White
 1989	Wishing Like a Mountain and Thinking Like the Sea – Poi Dog Pondering
 1989	Young Man's Blues – Rock City Angels 
 1989	Zig Zag – The Hooters
 1989	Flesh & Blood – Poison
 1989	I'm Your Baby Tonight – Whitney Houston

1990s to 2000s
 1990	Act III – Death Angel 
 1990	Barão: Ao Vivo – Barão Vermelho 
 1990	Busted – Cheap Trick 
 1990	Danzig II: Lucifuge – Danzig
 1990	Dig – Rob Mounsey & Flying Monkey Orchestra
 1990	Five Man Acoustical Jam	– Tesla
 1990	Flesh & Blood – Poison
 1990	Ghost of a Dog – Edie Brickell & New Bohemians  
 1990	Kojiki	– Kitaro 
 1990	Last Decade Dead Century – Warrior Soul
 1990	Lock up the Wolves – Dio 
 1990	Never, Neverland – Annihilator 
 1990	Pass It on Down – Alabama 
 1990	Rev It Up – Vixen 
 1990	Rituals – Michael Colina 
 1990	Saigon Kick – Saigon Kick 
 1990	Stiletto – Lita Ford 
 1990	Take It to Heart – Michael McDonald 
 1990	The Razor's Edge – AC/DC 
 1990	Up from the Ashes – Don Dokken 
 1991	A Little Ain't Enough – David Lee Roth
 1991	Cool Cat Blues – Georgie Fame 
 1991	Creatures of Habit – Billy Squier 
 1991	Damn Right, I've Got the Blues – Buddy Guy 
 1991	Drugs, God and the New Republic – Warrior Soul 
 1991	Fly Me Courageous – Drivin' n Cryin' 
 1991	Heavy Bones – Heavy Bones 
 1991	Hellacious Acres – Dangerous Toys 
 1991	Hot Wire – Kix 
 1991	Joyride – Roxette
 1991	Kitaro Live in America – Kitaro
 1991	Lights out on the Playground – Baton Rouge 
 1991	Lovescape – Neil Diamond 
 1991	Mane Attraction – White Lion 
 1991	Metallica – Metallica 
 1991	Places I Have Never Been – Willie Nile 
 1991	Schubert Dip – EMF 
 1991	Set the Night to Music – Roberta Flack 
 1991	Shadow of Urbano – Michael Colina 
 1991	Slave to the Grind – Skid Row 
 1991	Smile Blue – Ricky Peterson 
 1991	Steelheart – Steelheart 
 1991	Struck by Lightning – Graham Parker 
 1991	Sue Medley – Sue Medley 
 1991	The Heat – Dan Reed Network 
 1991	Until She Comes – The Psychedelic Furs 
 1991	Use Your Illusion I – Guns N' Roses 
 1991	Use Your Illusion II – Guns N' Roses 
 1991 	World Outside- The Psychedelic Furs	
 1992	A Dove – The Roches 
 1992	Blind Melon – Blind Melon 
 1992	Dog Eat Dog – Warrant 
 1992	Dream – Kitaro 
 1992	Feel This – The Jeff Healey Band 
 1992	Fire & Ice – Yngwie Malmsteen 
 1992	Force of Habit – Exodus 
 1992	Generation Terrorists – Manic Street Preachers  
 1992	Keep the Faith – Bon Jovi 
 1992	AC/DC Live – AC/DC 
 1992	Mitch Malloy – Mitch Malloy 
 1992	New Miserable Experience – Gin Blossoms 
 1992	One – Riverside 
 1992	Plaid – Blues Saraceno 
 1992	Revenge	– Kiss 
 1992	Rocks in the Head – Roger Daltrey 
 1992	Salutations from the Ghetto Nation – Warrior Soul 
 1992	Skew Siskin- Skew Siskin 
 1992	The Battle Rages On...	– Deep Purple 
 1992	The Christmas Album – Neil Diamond 
 1992	The Lizard – Saigon Kick 
 1992	The Ritual – Testament 
 1992	The Silent Majority – Life, Sex & Death 
 1992	The Woman I Am	– Chaka Khan 
 1992	Tongues and Tails – Sophie B. Hawkins 
 1992	Urban Discipline – Biohazard 
 1993	Animals with Human Intelligence – Enuff Z'nuff 
 1993	Back to Broadway – Barbra Streisand 
 1993	Believe in Me – Duff McKagan 
 1993	Bloody Kisses – Type O Negative 
 1993	Brother Cane – Brother Cane 
 1993	Chaos A.D. – Sepultura 
 1993	Chill Pill – Warrior Soul 
 1993	Desire Walks On	– Heart 
 1993	Devotion – Warren Hill 
 1993	Dig – I Mother Earth 
 1993	Dream Harder – The Waterboys 
 1993	Face the Heat – Scorpions 
 1993	Half Way Home – Half Way Home 
 1993	Heaven & Earth – Kitaro
 1993	Heavenly Bodie – Gene Loves Jezebel 
 1993	Letters from a Paper Ship – Billy Falcon 
 1993	Nothin' But Trouble – Blue Murder 
 1993	Oh! – Will Lee 
 1993	On Display – Eric Gadd 
 1993	Out of Body – The Hooters 
 1993	Psycofunkster Au Lait – La Union 
 1993	River Runs Red – Life of Agony 
 1993	Sister Sweetly – Big Head Todd & the Monsters 
 1993	Slip – Quicksand 
 1993	Smeared	– Sloan 
 1993	Tales of Ordinary Madness – Warren Haynes 
 1993	The Spaghetti Incident?	– Guns N' Roses 
 1993	The Vanishing Race – Air Supply 
 1993	Transnational Speedway League: Anthems, Anecdotes & Undeniable Truths – Clutch 
 1993	Up on the Roof: Songs from the Brill Building – Neil Diamond 
 1993	Za-Za – Bulletboys
 1994	Big Ones -Aerosmith 
 1994	Boingo- Oingo Boingo 
 1994	Box of Fire – Aerosmith 
 1994	Bust a Nut – Tesla 
 1994	Come Hell or High Water – Deep Purple 
 1994	Crash! Boom! Bang! – Roxette	 
 1994	Cross Road: The Best of Bon Jovi – Bon Jovi 
 1994	Defense Mechanism – Monster Voodoo Machine 
 1994	For Madmen Only	– Atomic Opera 
 1994	Grace – Jeff Buckley 
 1994	Hell & High Water: The Best of the Arista Years	– The Allman Brothers Band 
 1994	Hungry for Stink – L7 
 1994	Land of Broken Hearts – Royal Hunt 
 1994	Life's a Lesson	– Ben Sidran 
 1994	Live on Planet Earth – Neville Brothers 
 1994	Mandala	– Kitaro  
 1994	Mötley Crüe – Mötley Crüe 
 1994	Pride & Glory – Pride & Glory 
 1994	Push Comes to Shove  – Jackyl	 
 1994	Ride – Godspeed 
 1994	Sail Away – Great White 
 1994	Slippin' In – Buddy Guy 
 1994	State Voodoo/State Control – Monster Voodoo Machine 
 1994	Still Climbing	– Cinderella 
 1994	Strange Highways – Dio 
 1994	The Cult – The Cult 
 1994	Truth – Warren Hill 
 1994	Unboxed	– Sammy Hagar 
 1994	Weezer (Blue Album) – Weezer 
 1994	World Demise – Obituary 
 1994	Your Filthy Little Mouth – David Lee Roth 
 1995	$1.99 Romances – God Street Wine  
 1995	Balance	– Van Halen 
 1995	Ballbreaker – AC/DC 
 1995	Because They Can – Nelson 
 1995	Bette of Roses	– Bette Midler 
 1995	Burnin' Up – A Flock of Seagulls 
 1995	Clown In the Mirror – Royal Hunt 
 1995	Demanufacture – Fear Factory 	 
 1995	Driver Not Included – Orange 9mm 
 1995	Dysfunctional – Dokken
 1995	Love Is Strange	 – Phil Upchurch 
 1995	Manic Compression – Quicksand 
 1995	Movin' Up/Adventure Time – The Elvis Brothers 
 1995	Mugzy's Move – Royal Crown Revue 
 1995	Natural Woman – Giorgia	 
 1995	No Joke! – Meat Puppets 
 1995	Once Upon the Cross – Deicide	 
 1995	Ozzmosis – Ozzy Osbourne 
 1995	Passion, Grace and Fire/Live...One Summer N – Paco de Lucía 
 1995	Psyclone – Jimmy Barnes 
 1995	Relish – Joan Osborne 
 1995	Rising	– Yoko Ono 
 1995	Seemless – Into Another 
 1995	Set Your Goals – CIV 
 1995	Show Business – Kix 
 1995	Tear Can Tell – Ricky Peterson 
 1995	Temple Bar – John Waite 
 1995	The Space Age Playboys – Warrior Soul 
 1995	The Christmas Album – David Foster 
 1995	These Days – Bon Jovi 
 1995	Time Was – Curtis Stigers 
 1995	Tonin' – The Manhattan Transfer 
 1995	Twelve Deadly Cyns ... and then Some – Cyndi Lauper 
 1995	Ugly – Life of Agony 
 1995	Why the Long Face – Big Country 
 1995	Wrapped in Sky	– Drivin' n Cryin' 
 1995	You Dreamer [UK #1] – Big Country 
 1995	¡Adios Amigos! – The Ramones
 1995	A Flock of Seagulls – A Flock of Seagulls
 1995	Living in Fear – The Power Station
 1995	Load – Metallica
 1996	Standing in My Shoes – Leo Kottke
 1996	5 Live – Fluffy 
 1996	Alfagamabetizado – Carlinhos Brown 
 1996	Baile de MasCaras – Maldita Vecindad 
 1996	Bang, The Earth is Round – The Sugarplastic
 1996	Black Eye – Fluffy 
 1996	Blues and Me – Georgie Fame 
 1996	Box of Frogs/Strange Land – Box of Frogs 
 1996	Cambio De Piel – Alejandra Guzmán 
 1996	Come Find Yourself – Fun Lovin' Criminals 
 1996	Early Recordings – Joan Osborne 
 1996	High/Low – Nada Surf 
 1996	Hooterization – The Hooters 
 1996	Immortal – Beth Hart 
 1996	LifeLines Live – Peter, Paul and Mary 
 1996	Light at the End of the World – A Flock of Seagulls 
 1996	Living With Ghosts – Patty Griffin 
 1996	Living in Fear – The Power Station 
 1996	Load – Metallica 
 1996	Louder Than Hell – Manowar	 
 1996	Magnolia – The Screamin' Cheetah Wheelies 
 1996	Michael McDermott – Michael McDermott 
 1996	Miles to Go – Don Lewis Band 
 1996	Mr. P's Shuffle – Ben Sidran 
 1996	No Lunch – D Generation  
 1996	October Rust – Type O Negative 
 1996	One Chord to Another – Sloan 
 1996	One More Go Round – Giorgia 
 1996	Oz Factor – Unwritten Law 
 1996	Piece of Your Soul – Storyville 
 1996	Pinkerton – Weezer
 1996	Power Pop, Vol. 1 – The Raspberries	 
 1996	Pure Instinct – Scorpions 
 1996	Red – God Street Wine	 	  	 
 1996	The Gray Race – Bad Religion 
 1996	The Roots of Sepultura – Sepultura	 
 1996	Then Again, Maybe I Won't – Johnny Bravo	 
 1996	Trial by Fire – Journey	 	 
 1996	We the People – Groove Collective 
 1996	White Light White Heat White Trash – Social Distortion
 1997	24 Karat Hits! – Elvis Presley 
 1997	A Story	– Yoko Ono 
 1997	American Lesion	– American Lesion	 
 1997	Bonfire	– AC/DC	  
 1997	Circlesongs – Bobby McFerrin	 
 1997	Come Walk with Me – Oleta Adams
 1997	Come In and Burn – Rollins Band	 
 1997	Definitive Collection – Eric Carmen	 	 
 1997	Destination Anywhere – Jon Bon Jovi	 
 1997	Egyptology – World Party	 
 1997	Eight Arms to Hold You	– Veruca Salt	 
 1997	Eleanor McEvoy	– Eleanor McEvoy	 
 1997	Feeding the Future – Dogma	 
 1997	First Rays of the New Rising Sun – Jimi Hendrix	 
 1997	G3: Live in Concert – Joe Satriani 		 
 1997	Love Is a Dog from Hell – Maggie Estep 
 1997	Neverland – Night Ranger 
 1997	No Holds Barred: Live in Europe	– Biohazard	 
 1997	Once upon a...	– Cinderella	 
 1997	One More Time – Real McCoy	  
 1997	Reload	– Metallica 
 1997	Resolution – .38 Special 
 1997	Restraining Bolt – Radish 
 1997	Richard Julian – Richard Julian 
 1997	Sand and Water – Beth Nielsen Chapman 
 1997	Sisters of Avalon – Cyndi Lauper 
 1997	Soul Searching Sun – Life of Agony 
 1997	South Saturn Delta – Jimi Hendrix 
 1997	Standing in My Shoes – Leo Kottke 
 1997	The Big 3 – 60 Ft. Dolls 
 1997	The Cicadas – The Cicadas 
 1997	The Truth – Brady Seals 
 1997	The World According to Per Gessle – Per Gessle 
 1997	Troublizing – Ric Ocasek 
 1997	Uma Outra Estação – Legião Urbana 
 1997	We Can't All Be Angels – David Lee Murphy 
 1997	Where Are You Now – Deanna Kirk
 1998	100% Columbian	– Fun Lovin' Criminals 
 1998	99th Dream – Swervedriver 
 1998	Better Than This – The Normals 
 1998	Brady Seals – Brady Seals 
 1998	Breed the Killers – Earth Crisis 
 1998	Colin James and the Little Big Band II	– Colin James 
 1998	Crystal Planet – Joe Satriani	 
 1998	Dose – Gov't Mule 
 1998	Eddie's Head – Iron Maiden 
 1998	Flaming Red – Patty Griffin 
 1998	Garage, Inc. – Metallica 
 1998	Go Faster – The Black Crowes  
 1998	Heavy Love – Buddy Guy 
 1998	I'm So Confused	– Jonathan Richman 
 1998	Just What You Want – Eboni Foster  
 1998	Little Piece of Heaven – Neville Brothers 
 1998	Merry Christmas...Have a Nice Life! – Cyndi Lauper 
 1998	My Way or the Highway – Tuscadero 
 1998	Naked – Brownie Mary 
 1998	Navy Blues – Sloan 
 1998	New Sheets – Possum Dixon 
 1998	Ordinary Time – Jim Morgan 
 1998	Pack Up the Cats – Local H 
 1998	Prisoner of Love – Russ Columbo 
 1998	Psycho Circus – Kiss 
 1998	So Real	– Kenny Smith 
 1998	Soulfly	 – Soulfly	  
 1998	The Contender – Royal Crown Revue  
 1998	When You're in Love (For the First Time) – Steve Perry 
 1998	Wonsaponatime – John Lennon
 1999	Parachutes – Coldplay
 1999	Razorblade Romance – H.I.M. 
 1999	A Place in the Sun – Lit 
 1999	A Tempestade ou O Livro Dos Dias – Legião Urbana 
 1999	Between the Bridges – Sloan 
 1999	Bleach – Bleach
 1999	Born Again Savage – Little Steven & the Disciples of Soul 
 1999	By Your Side – The Black Crowes 
 1999	Celtic Solstice	– Paul Winter 
 1999	Chamber Music	– Coal Chamber 
 1999  Home - Annie Minogue
 1999	Depleting Moral Legacy	– Leo Sidran 
 1999	From Beyond the Back Burner – Gas Giants  
 1999	Happiness Is Not a Fish That You Can Catch – Our Lady Peace	 
 1999	Have a Nice Day – Roxette	 
 1999	Hot Animal Machine/Drive By Shooting [1999] – Henry Rollins 
 1999	Insert Band Here: Live in Australia 1990 – Rollins Band 
 1999	Is Anybody Home? – Our Lady Peace 
 1999	Joy: A Holiday Collection – Jewel 
 1999	L' Intégrale Bercy – France Gall 
 1999	Live at Celebrity Lounge – Ben Sidran 
 1999	Live at Woodstock – Jimi Hendrix 
 1999	Live at the Budokan – Chic 
 1999	Live at the Fillmore East – Jimi Hendrix 
 1999	Live: Era '87–'93 – Guns N' Roses 
 1999	Llegó Van Van – Los Van Van 
 1999	Mimosa	– Fun Lovin' Criminals 
 1999	Only a Fool [US CD Single] – The Black Crowes 
 1999	Proud Like a God – Guano Apes 
 1999	Red Carpet Sindrome – Bolt Upright 	 
 1999	S&M – Metallica 
 1999	Spirit	– Peter Buffett 
 1999	The Ladder – Yes 
 1999	Throttle Junkies – Soil 
 1999	Torch This Place – The Atomic Fireballs 
 1999	Tropico/Seven the Hard Way – Pat Benatar 
 1999	Under a Violet Moon – Blackmore's Night 
 1999	Valence Street – Neville Brothers 
 1999	World Coming Down – Type O Negative
 1999	Wrathchild – Iron Maiden

2000 – 2012
 2000	Iowa – Slipknot
 2000	Silver Side Up – Nickelback
 2000	Stiff Upper Lip – AC/DC
 2000	3001 – Rita Lee 
 2000	A Place To Stand – The Killdares	 
 2000	Ain't Life Grand – Slash's Snakepit 
 2000	An Education in Rebellion – The Union Underground 
 2000	An Evening with the Blues – Mark Cook 
 2000	Another Spin Around the Sun – Edwin 
 2000	As Dez Mais – Titãs 
 2000	Beautiful Something – Mars Electric 
 2000	Blue Night – Michael Learns to Rock 
 2000	Brave New World – Iron Maiden 
 2000	Christmas Stays the Same – Linda Eder	 
 2000	Crush – Bon Jovi 
 2000	Draw Them Near	– Jess Klein 
 2000	Experiment on a Flat Planet – Soulhat 
 2000	Full Devil Jacket – Full Devil Jacket 
 2000	Fuzzbubble – Fuzzbubble 
 2000	Get Some Go Again – Rollins Band 	 
 2000	Good to the Last Drop – God Street Wine 
 2000	Hagnesta Hill – Kent 
 2000	I Ett Vinterland – Ulf Lundell 
 2000	If You Sleep – Tal Bachman 
 2000	Into the Light – David Coverdale	 
 2000	Introduction to Mayhem – Primer 55 
 2000	Isopor – Pato Fu	 	 
 2000	Kingpin	– Tinsley Ellis 
 2000	L. Sid	– Leo Sidran 
 2000	Live at the Agora Ballroom Atlanta, Georgia April 20, 1979 [Phoenix Gems] – Molly Hatchet 
 2000	Live at the Greek – The Black Crowes 
 2000	Parachutes – Coldplay 
 2000	Razorblade Romance – H.I.M. 
 2000	Song to Fly – Song to Fly 
 2000	The Dark Ride – Helloween  
 2000	The Masquerade Ball – Axel Rudi Pell 
 2000	The Optimist – Eric Bazilian 
 2000	The Wizard's Chosen Few	– Axel Rudi Pell 
 2000	Thirteen Tales from Urban Bohemia – The Dandy Warhols 
 2000	Wonder Bar – Martin Sexton 
 2001	Away From the Sun – 3 Doors Down
 2001	Six Degrees of Inner Turbulence – Dream Theater
 2001	Silver Side Up – Nickelback  
 2001	Arrival	– Journey
 2001	Back to Bogalusa – Clarence "Gatemouth" Brown 
 2001	Barricades & Brickwalls	– Kasey Chambers 
 2001	Blueprint for a Sunrise	– Yoko Ono 
 2001	Died Laughing – Keith Caputo 
 2001	Digimortal – Fear Factory 
 2001	Every Six Seconds – Saliva 
 2001	Here's Luck – The Honeydogs	  
 2001	Hopeless Case of a Kid in Denial – The Hellacopters 
 2001	I Primi Anni – Giorgia 
 2001	I Tried to Rock You But You Only Roll – Leona Naess 
 2001	Just Another Phase – The Moffatts 
 2001	Just Push Play – Aerosmith 
 2001	Katy Hudson – Katy Hudson 
 2001	Live Metropolis, Pt. 2 – Dream Theater
 2001	Love and Theft – Bob Dylan 
 2001	Making Enemies Is Good – Backyard Babies 
 2001	Pretty Together	– Sloan   
 2001	That's What I Am – Eric Gales 
 2001	Vou Ser Feliz E Já Volto – Paulo Miklos 
 2001	Wake Up and Smell the Coffee – The Cranberries 
 2002	Beauty of the Rain – Dar Williams
 2002	Central Park Concert – Dave Matthews Band
 2002	Welcome Interstate Managers – Fountains of Wayne
 2002	A Rush of Blood to the Head – Coldplay
 2002	1000 Kisses – Patty Griffin 
 2002	A New Day at Midnight – David Gray 
 2002	Away from the Sun – 3 Doors Down 
 2002	Blue Wild Angel: Live at the Isle of Wight – Jimi Hendrix 
 2002	Bounce	– Bon Jovi
 2002	Century Spring	– Mason Jennings 
 2002	Cheer Up! – Reel Big Fish 
 2002	Cobblestone Runway – Ron Sexsmith 
 2002	Deep Shadows and Brilliant Highlights- 	H.I.M. 
 2002	Degradation Trip – Jerry Cantrell 
 2002	Did Anyone Approach You	– a-ha 
 2002	Elv1s: 30#1 Hits – Elvis Presley 
 2002	Final Days: Anthems for the Apocalypse- Plasmatics 
 2002	Gravity	– Our Lady Peace 
 2002	High Visibility	– The Hellacopters 
 2002	L' Eccezione – Carmen Consoli 
 2002	No Pads, No Helmets...Just Balls – Simple Plan
 2002	Paradize – Indochine 
 2002	Six Degrees of Inner Turbulence	– Dream Theater 
 2002	Superkala – Course of Nature 
 2002	Take a Deep Breath – Brighton Rock 
 2002	The Promise Highway – Mark Cook 
 2002	Theory of a Deadman – Theory of a Deadman 
 2002	Under a Pale Grey Sky – Sepultura	
 2003	Live at the Beacon Theater – The Allman Brothers
 2003	We are Not Alone – Breaking Benjamin
 2003	Action Pact – Sloan
 2003	Beautiful Lumps of Coal	– Plumb
 2003	Buried Alive by Love – H.I.M.
 2003	Dead Generation – Sloth
 2003	Dead Letters – The Rasmus
 2003	Departure – Carla Werner
 2003	Escape from Cape Coma – Twisted Method
 2003	Frengers – Mew
 2003	Giving the Devil His Due – Coal Chamber
 2003	Hatefiles – Fear Factory
 2003	Hellalive – Machine Head
 2003	How Can I Sleep with Your Voice in My Head – a-ha
 2003	How the West Was Won – Led Zeppelin
 2003	Life Is Killing Me – Type O Negative
 2003	Live at Berkeley: 2nd Show – Jimi Hendrix
 2003	Lo Que Te Conté Mientras Te Hacías la Dormida – La Oreja de Van Gogh
 2003	Love Metal – H.I.M.
 2003	Matches & Gasoline – Chacon
 2003	Rock the Block – Krokus
 2003	Sing Me Something New – David Fonseca
 2003	The Beauty of the Rain – Dar Williams
 2003	The Deepest End, Live in Concert – Gov't Mule
 2003	The Long Road – Nickelback
 2003	The Rise of Brutality – Hatebreed
 2003	This Left Feels Right – Bon Jovi
 2003	Three Days Grace – Three Days Grace
 2003	We Used to Be Friends – The Dandy Warhols
 2003	We've Come for You All – Anthrax
 2003	Welcome Interstate Managers – Fountains of Wayne
 2003	Where You Are – Socialburn
 2003	Yellow Blues – Rollins Band
 2004	Octavarium – Dream Theater
 2004	Sixty Six Steps – Leo Kottke & Mike Gordon
 2004	100,000,000 Bon Jovi Fans Can't Be Wrong – Bon Jovi  
 2004	Because I Can – Katy Rose 
 2004	Circus – Circus
 2004	Contraband – Velvet Revolver 
 2004	Is There Love in Space?	– Joe Satriani
 2004	Light of the Moon – The Pierces
 2004	Live from Earth/Wide Awake in Dreamland – Pat Benatar
 2004	Live from the Gypsy Road – Cinderella
 2004	Moonlight Survived – Moments in Grace
 2004	One Team One Spirit – Gotthard
 2004	Part of You – Eric Gale
 2004	Penny & Me – Hanson
 2004	Retriever – Ron Sexsmith
 2004	Scream & Whisper – Edwin McCain
 2004	Seven Wiser – Seven Wiser
 2004	Some Kind of Monster – Metallica
 2004	Still Not Getting Any... – Simple Plan
 2004	Stolen Car (Take Me Dancing) – Sting
 2004	The Battle for Everything – Five for Fighting
 2004	The Experience Sessions	– Noel Redding
 2004	The Hard Way – Owsley
 2004	Tyrannosaurus Hives – The Hives
 2004	Underneath – Hanson
 2004	We Are Not Alone – Breaking Benjamin
 2005	Whatever People Say I Am, That's What I'm Not – Arctic Monkeys
 2005	World Container – The Tragically Hip
 2005	Analogue – a-ha 
 2005	And the Glass Handed Kites – Mew
 2005    "Extreme Behavior" – Hinder
 2005	Celice – a-ha 
 2005	Choose Love – Ringo Starr 
 2005	Crazy – Simple Plan 
 2005	Have a Nice Day – Bon Jovi 
 2005	Healthy in Paranoid Times – Our Lady Peace
 2005	Hedley – Hedley 
 2005	Here I Am – Marion Raven 
 2005	In the Clear – Ivy 
 2005	Juturna	– Circa Survive 
 2005	L' Heure d'Été	– Marc Lavoine 
 2005	L' Uomo Sogna Di Volare	– Negrita 
 2005	Let There Be Morning – The Perishers 
 2005	Live Letters – The Rasmus 
 2005	Livin' in the City – Fun Lovin' Criminals 
 2005	Mi Corazon – Fun Lovin' Criminals 
 2005 Tripping The Velvet - Annie Minogue Band
 2005	Nahaufnahme – Westernhagen 
 2005	Nexterday – Ric Ocasek 
 2005	Out of Nothing	– Embrace 
 2005	Out-of-State Plates – Fountains of Wayne 
 2005	Perception – Blessid Union of Souls 
 2005	Prince of Darkness – Ozzy Osbourne 
 2005	Red, White & Crüe – Mötley Crüe   
 2005	Seventeen Days – 3 Doors Down 
 2005	Super Extra Gravity – The Cardigans 
 2005	Superbeautifulmonster – Bif Naked 
 2005	The Body Acoustic – Cyndi Lauper
 2005	The High Speed Scene – High Speed Scene
 2005	Under Cover – Ozzy Osbourne
 2005	Wings – Skylark 
 2005	The World Can Wait – 67 Special 
 2005	X&Y – Coldplay
 2006	A Decade – Our Lady Peace 
 2006	A Thousand Different Ways – Clay Aiken 
 2006	Analogue (All I Want) – a-ha	 
 2006	Awake – Josh Groban 
 2006	Boys Like Girls – Boys Like Girls	
 2006	Can't Catch Tomorrow (Good Shoes Won't Save You This Time) – Lostprophets
 2006	Chariot	– Gavin DeGraw
 2006	Citizen X – Palumbo  
 2006	Dante XXI – Sepultura
 2006	Dead FM	– Strike Anywhere	
 2006	Empire – Kasabian	 
 2006	For the Taken – Mercy Fall 
 2006	Hold the Fire – Tommy James 
 2006	Holding My Breath – Mike Willis 
 2006	Homo Sapiens – The Cooper Temple Clause 
 2006	Horny as a Dandy – The Dandy Warhols 
 2006	In a Million Pieces – The Draft 
 2006	Into the Harbour – Southside Johnny 
 2006	JB50 – Jimmy Barnes 
 2006	Keep Your Heart	– The Loved Ones 
 2006	Liberation Transmission	– Lostprophets
 2006	Like Cold Rain Kills a Summer Day – Janez Detd.
 2006	Make This Your Own – The Cooper Temple Clause 
 2006	Minutes to Miles – Crash Romeo 
 2006	No Balance Palace – Kashmir 
 2006	One World – The Feelers 
 2006	Say I Am You – The Weepies 
 2006	Stand – Michael W. Smith 
 2006	Super Colossal – Joe Satriani 
 2006	The Mother, the Mechanic, and the Path – The Early November 
 2006	World Container – The Tragically Hip 
 2007	The Foundation – Zac Brown Band
 2007	Overcome – All That Remains 
 2007	Blood Brothers – Rose Tattoo  
 2007	Djin Djin – Angélique Kidjo
 2007	Favourite Worst Nightmare – Arctic Monkeys 
 2007	Freedom's Road – John Mellencamp	 
 2007	Here & Now – America 	 
 2007	Lez Zeppelin – Lez Zeppelin 
 2007	Live at Monterey – The Jimi Hendrix Experience 
 2007	Ringo Starr: Live at Soundstage – Ringo Starr 
 2007	Lost Highway – Bon Jovi  
 2007	On Letting Go – Circa Survive 
 2007	One for All – Peter Criss  
 2007	Plug Me In – AC/DC 
 2007	The Shade of Poison Trees – Dashboard Confessional
 2007	These Things Move in Threes – Mumm-Ra	 
 2007	Time Stand Still – The Hooters
 2007	Traffic and Weather – Fountains of Wayne
 2007	Yes, I'm a Witch – Yoko Ono 
 2008 3 Doors Down – 3 Doors Down 
 2008 A Fondness for Hometown Scars – Keith Caputo 
 2008 Alive: The Millennium Concert – Kiss 
 2008 Black Ice – AC/DC  
 2008 Bring Ya to the Brink – Cyndi Lauper 
 2008 Cien Noches (One Hundred Nights at the Cafe) – Ben Sidran 
 2008 Cinderella: Live in Concert – Cinderella 
 2008 Hideaway – The Weepies 
 2008 Horror Wrestling – Drain 
 2008 How to Be a Megastar Live! – Blue Man Group 
 2008 I Love Christmas – Tommy James 
 2008 I, Lucifer – Destroy the Runner  
 2008 Little Wild One – Joan Osborne 
 2008 Live at Berkeley – The Jimi Hendrix Experience 
 2008 Lucky – Nada Surf
 2008 Monday's Ghost – Sophie Hunger 
 2008 No, Virginia...	– The Dresden Dolls 
 2008 Real Animal – Alejandro Escovedo 
 2008 Revelation – Journey
 2008 Rise and Fall, Rage and Grace – The Offspring 
 2008 Scream Aim Fire	– Bullet for My Valentine 
 2008 Surfing with the Alien/Is There Love in Space? – Joe Satriani
 2008 Symphony – Sarah Brightman
 2008 The Foundation – Zac Brown Band	
 2009 The Suburbs – Arcade Fire
 2009 The Circle – Bon Jovi
 2009 Adelitas Way – Adelitas Way
 2009 Already Free – The Derek Trucks Band 
 2009 Both Sides Live	– The Hooters
 2009 Celebración de la Ciudad Natal – My Morning Jacket
 2009 Crazy Love – Michael Bublé* 2009	Dylan Different – Ben Sidran
 2009 Live in Paris & Ottawa 1968 [CD/LP]	– The Jimi Hendrix Experience
 2009 Live Blues in Red Square – Wolf Mail
 2009 Live at Madison Square Garden	–  Bon Jovi
 2009 Moving Forward	– Bernie Williams
 2009 War Is the Answer – Five Finger Death Punch
 2009 We Are the Same – The Tragically Hip
 2010 Be My Thrill – The Weepies
 2010 Black Swans and Wormhole Wizards – Joe Satriani
 2010 Dark Is the Way, Light Is a Place – Anberlin
 2010 Everyday Demons – The Answer
 2010 Hammer of the North – Grand Magus
 2010 Hollywood: The Deluxe EP – Michael Bublé
 2010 I Liked It Better When You Had No Heart – Butch Walker
 2010 If I Had a Hi-Fi – Nada Surf
 2010 Lez Zeppelin I – Lez Zeppelin
 2010 Memphis Blues – Cyndi Lauper
 2010 Order of the Black – Black Label Society
 2010 Warren Haynes Presents: The Benefit Concert, Vol. 3 – Warren Haynes
 2010 Dust Bowl – Joe Bonamassa
 2011 The Song Remains Not the Same – Black Label Society
 2011 Clocks'n'Clouds – Fauve
 2011 Suck It and See – Arctic Monkeys
 2011 Angles – The Strokes
 2011 The Great God Pan – Spirits of the Dead
 2011 Stranger Me – Amy LaVere
 2011 Sky Full of Holes – Fountains of Wayne
 2011 Long Player Late Bloomer – Ron Sexsmith
 2011 If Not Now, When? – Incubus
 2011 Winterland – Jimi Hendrix 4-CD set
 2012 Live in New York City – Paul Simon

5.1 Surround
 Bob Dylan's Blonde on Blonde, Love and Theft, Slow Train Coming, Bringing It All Back Home and Another Side of Bob Dylan
 Led Zeppelin – How the West Was Won

Soundtracks
 2010 Iron Man 2 [Original Motion Picture Soundtrack] – AC/DC
 2008 Mamma Mia! The Movie Soundtrack
 2007 Music and Lyrics
 2005 Wild Ocean [Bonus Track]	John Hughes
 2004 .hack//Sign: Original Soundtrack [Original Soundtrack]
 2003 Freddy Vs. Jason – The Original Motion Picture Soundtrack – Roadrunner Records
 2002 Resident Evil: Music From And Inspired By The Original Motion Picture – Roadrunner Records
 2001 More Music from The Fast and the Furious
 2001 Bridget Jones's Diary 
 2000 Gone in Sixty Seconds
 1999 End of Days
 1998 Armageddon 
 1996 Rent [Original Broadway Cast Recording]	Original Broadway Cast
 1996 The Crow: City of Angels ("Gold Dust Woman") 
 1996 Flirting with Disaster (Original Motion Picture Soundtrack)
 1996 Barb Wire  (Original Motion Picture Soundtrack)
 1995 Smokey Joe's Cafe: The Songs of Leiber and Stoller	Original Broadway Cast
 1995 A Tale of Cinderella: New Musical for the Whole Family	
 1995 Hoop Dreams [Original Soundtrack] – Ben Sidran 
 1995 Interview with the Vampire – 	Elliot Goldenthal 
 1995 New York Rock [Original Cast] – Yoko Ono
 1992 Home Alone 2: Lost in New York [Original Soundtrack]
 1992 The Bodyguard [Original Motion Picture Soundtrack]
 1990 Pretty Woman
 1986 Labyrinth [From the Original Soundtrack of the Jim Henson Film]	Trevor Jones
 1985 St. Elmo's Fire
 1982 Dreamgirls [Original Broadway Cast Album]	
 1980 Times Square – The Original Motion Picture Soundtrack
 1978 Working [Original Cast Recording]

DVDs, Video Games and Television Specials
 2012 Paul Simon – Live in New York City (DVD)
 2009 John Lennon: Power to the People (DVD) 
 2009 Ninja Gaiden Sigma 2 (Video Game) 
 2009 Wolf Mail: Live Blues in Red Square (DVD)
 2008 Jimi Hendrix: Live at Woodstock [Blu-ray] 
 2007 O.A.R.: Live From Madison Square Garden (DVD)
 2006 Josh Groban: Awake (DVD)
 2006 Whitesnake: Live in the Still of the Night [DVD]
 2006  Andrea Bocelli: Amore Under the Desert Sky –  Great Performances (TV Series) 
 2004 Simple Plan: Still Not Getting Any... (Video short) 
 2004 Ghost in the Shell [Sony PlayStation Soundtrack] 
 2003 Ringo Starr – Ringo Rama
 2003 Martin Scorsese Presents the Blues: Jimi Hendrix
 2003 Dave Matthews Band: The Central Park Concert (TV Special documentary)  
 2003 Led Zeppelin DVD (Video documentary)  
 2002 Nickelback: Live at Home (Video documentary)  
 2000 Jesus: The Epic Mini-Series [Original Television Soundtrack]
 2000 Metallica With Michael Kamen Conducting San Francisco Symphony Orchestra
 1999 Jimi Hendrix: Live at Woodstock (Video documentary)

Box Sets
Led Zeppelin, Metallica, AC/DC, Jimi Hendrix, Crimson Glory, Bon Jovi, Loverboy, John Lennon, CIV, Cheap Trick, Alice Cooper, Cyndi Lauper, Kiss, Patti Smith, Journey, Toto, The Cars, Tony Orlando and Dawn, Santana, Psychedelic Furs

References

Discographies of American artists